Whittman-Hart was a services company dealing with digital communications.

History
Founded by Bob Bernard Bill Merchantz, Rich Colson, and Bill Topol in the Chicago area in 1984, it specialized first in IBM AS/400 IT consulting. It grew steadily, for about 15 years, including some acquisitions. The company went public in 1996. In 1997, Fortune magazine named it one of the fastest-growing companies in the US.

In 1999 the company acquired Fulcrum Solutions Ltd, a UK-based Oracle technology specialist and, shortly afterwards  US Web/CKS, a California-based web consulting firm, after which Bob Bernard decided to rename the business marchFIRST, inc., the business was re-corporated on March 1, 2000. This was at the height of the dot-com boom in 2000.

However, the company failed later that year, shuttering dozens of locations throughout the USA. It changed owners up to 2003, when it was reacquired by Bob Bernard. It still operates, but is not publicly traded.  Its stock symbol was WHIT.

In 2005–2006 WHITTMANHART acquired numerous organizations, including Ohio-based Infinis Inc, Philadelphia-based Insight Interactive Group Inc, Maryland-based Estco.net, LLC, Chicago-based Vision Enterprises, and Los Angeles-based DNA Studio.

Rolta acquired Whittman-Hart Consulting on July 29, 2008.

WhittmanHart rebranded as Band Digital, Inc. on September 28, 2010.

Whitmann-Hart Acquires UK Based Fulcrum Solutions Ltd

References

External links
 Previously the official website:  http://www.whittmanhart.com/
 Rolta acquires WHITTMANHART
 WHITMANNHART acquires Fulcrum Solutions

Information technology consulting firms of the United States
Defunct technology companies of the United States
Defunct companies based in Chicago
Consulting firms established in 1984
Technology companies established in 1984
Technology companies disestablished in 2013
Defunct companies based in Illinois